Anwar Ali (born 1 July 1966), also known Anvar Ali, is an Indian poet and lyricist writing in Malayalam. He is also a literary editor and critic, translator, screen-writer, and documentary filmmaker.

Career

Literature
Ali’s first collection of poems, Mazhakkalam (The Rainy Season, 1999), established him as a prominent voice in contemporary Malayalam poetry. Ali’s poetry collections include Aadiyaadi Alanja Marangale (Ye Trees, Swaying Ramblers, 2009) and Mehaboob Express (2020). Eternal Sculptures (2007) is a collection of his poems in English translation. His novella, Njan Rappai, was published in 1995.

Ali’s poems have been translated into various Indian and foreign languages and have been included in several anthologies of contemporary poetry, such as Innan Ganges flyter in i natten (A Swedish Anthology of Indian Poetry in Hindi, Malayalam and English, edited by Tomas Lofstrom and Birgitta Wallin); Singing in the Dark - A Global Anthology of Poetry Under Lockdown (edited by K. Satchidanandan and Nishi Chawla); Oxford India Anthology of Modern Malayalam Literature, Volume 1 (edited by P. P. Raveendran and GS Jayasree); and The Tree of Tongues (edited by E V Ramakrishnan).

Ali translated Totto-Chan: The Little Girl at the Window, the Japanese autobiographical memoir of Tetsuko Kuroyanagi – a literary classic, into Malayalam in 1994. He co-translated Sirpi Balasubramaniam’s poetry collection Oru Gramathile Nadi (A River in a Village, 2010). He has translated a series of modern Anglophone African poems and poems from Indian languages like Tamil, Hindi, Kannada, and Assamese into Malayalam.

On Ali’s contribution to Malayalam poetry, his friend and fellow poet Anitha Thampi has highlighted Ali’s unique exploration and transformation of the language of poetry in Malayalam. Further, Amrith Lal of The New Indian Express, a cultural columnist and critic, observes, "Ali has carried forward the poetic language, constantly experimenting with its structures, drawing from Malayalam’s rich inheritance of story-telling and narrative poetry, the careful moulding of poetic metres, cross-fertilisation of the vocabulary by borrowing from popular culture, street talk and community lingo, using classical modes as well as parody, leaning on cinema and performance traditions to energise the art."

Other works

Ali has notably experimented with the performance of his poetry. In 2015–2017, he created a poetry band, Leaves of Grass, with guitarist and composer John P. Varkey. The band’s performances combined the stylistic aspects of performance poetry with rock music.

In 2018, he collaborated with Olam, an instrumental band, to perform Mehboob Express, a long narrative poem that has gained acclaim as a chronological, sociocultural saga and critique of Indian politics. In 2017, in the maiden show at Uru Art Harbour, Mattancherry, curated by artist Riyas Komu, Ali showcased the living culture around legendary Mattancherry singer Mehboob (singer) through an audio-visual installation . Produced under the banner of Image Commune (2015), Ali’s debut documentary film on Attoor Ravi Varma, Maruvili (Call from the other Shore), was selected for the International Documentary and Short Film Festival of Kerala (2015); Mumbai International Film Festival (2016); Jaffna International Film Festival, Sri Lanka (2016); and SIGNS Festival of Federation of Film Societies of India, Kerala (2015).

He co-wrote the screenplay of  Margam (2003), an acclaimed Malayalam feature film, and co-directed a documentary series on the history of Malayalam cinema for Kerala State Film Development Corporation. He contributed to Shasthra Kouthukam, a science programme that aired in Doordarshan between 1991 and 1995, on behalf of the Centre for Development of Imaging Technology.

Ali co-edited the journals Pakshikkoottam (Flock of Birds), an alternate journal and publishing house, and Kavithakku Oru Idam (A Space for Poetry), a journal for new poetry in Malayalam. He was the chief content editor of Seventy-Five Years of Malayalam Cinema, a digital encyclopaedia produced
by Kerala State Chalachitra Academy (2003).

Ali was invited to South Korea for the Writer-in-Residence Program of the Literature Translation Institute of Korea  in 2007 and attended the 2007 Afro-Asian Literature Festival in Jeonju, Korea. He has presented his work in various poetry, literary, and film festivals, including Young Poets Meet, New Delhi (1997); The New Voices, Trivandrum (2004); Asselieh Film Festival, Morocco (2004); Kavi Bharati, Bhopal (2005); Paju Book Festival, South Korea (2014); Sharjah International Book Fair (2014 & 2018); Bharatiya Kavita Samaroh, Patna (2014); Samanvay: IHC Indian Languages' Festival, New Delhi (2014); Jaffna International Film Festival, Sri Lanka (2016); and Kokrajhar Literary Festival, Bodoland, Assam (2021).

Ali’s distinctive poetic idiom illuminates the lyrics of Annayum Rasoolum (2013), one among the films that brought a paradigm shift in Malayalam cinema. In his subsequent work, he has continued to experiment with fresh and bold poetic imagery and style, thus treading away from tradition and gaining much popularity among young audiences and filmmakers. Some of his notable works include Njan Steve Lopez (2014), Kammatipaadam (2016), Kismath (2016), Mayaanadhi (2017), Eeda (2018), Thottappan (2019), Kumbalangi Nights (2019), Nayattu (2021 film) (2020), Bhoomiyile Manohara Swakaryam (2020), Malik (film) (2021), and Oru Thekkan Thallu Case (2022).

Awards

Literary awards 

 1992- Kunchu Pillai Award 
 2000- Kanakasree Endowment Award of Kerala Sahitya Akademi
 2021- Kerala Sahitya Akademi Award for Poetry  for Mehaboob Express.

Film awards for lyrics

Other awards 
 Kerala State Film Award for Best Screenplay (2003):  Margam 
 The South-South Film Encounter, Morocco (2003) - Best Screenplay: Margam 
 Fajr International Film Festival (2003) - Best Screenplay:  Margam 
 SIGNS Festival - Best Biopic Award (2015): Maruvili

Literary works 

1994–  Janalakkarikile Penkutty (Translation of Totto-Chan: The Little Girl at the Window )
1995– Njan Rappai (Novella)
1999– Mazhakkalam (Poems)
 2007 - Eternal Sculptures (Poetry Collection in English)
 2009– Aadiyaadi Alanja Marangale (Poems)
 2010– Oru Gramathile Nadi (Translation of Poetry Collection by Sirpi Balasubramaniam)

As lyricist

Film songs

Non-film songs

References 
Must not allow hijacking of cultural bodies: Malayalam poet

Poetry Reading Anvar Ali
 
heraldofindia.com

 Anvar Ali, an alchemist of words Anvar Ali, an alchemist of words
 Death Walk close to the bone Death Walk close to the bone
 Siddique's insult of the Sun God and how EMS pronounced Coca Cola...Siddique's insult of the Sun God and how EMS pronounced Coca Cola

External links
A poet’s meet in Kochi looks at the way ahead for modern Malayalam poetry
മരിച്ച മാതൃഭൂമിയിൽ ഇനി എഴുതില്ലെന്ന് കവി അൻവർ അലി | Madhyamam
ആണുറക്കം, അന്‍വര്‍ അലിയുടെ അഞ്ച് കവിതകള്‍
മാലിക് ചെയ്തത് ഒന്നര വർഷമെടുത്ത്; കേൾക്കുന്നവരെ ലൂപ്പിലാക്കുന്ന സംഗീതത്തിന് പിന്നിൽ: സുഷിൻ ശ്യാം അഭിമുഖം
Death Walk close to the bone
'കിനോകുന്യാ'- അന്‍വര്‍ അലി എഴുതിയ കവിത
ഹൂറി കൊണ്ടോയോരു പാട്ട് | Anvar Ali
കൊണ്ടോട്ടി എയർപോർട്ടിൽ നിന്ന്...by Leaves of Grass

Malayalam poets
Writers from Thiruvananthapuram
1966 births
Living people
Indian male poets
20th-century Indian poets
Poets from Kerala
20th-century Indian male writers